Neilia Hunter Biden (July 28, 1942 – December 18, 1972) was an American teacher and the first wife of Joe Biden, the 46th and current president of the United States. She died in a car crash in 1972 with her one-year-old daughter, Naomi. Her two sons, Beau and Hunter, were both critically injured, but survived the wreck.

Early life and career 

Neilia Hunter was born on July 28, 1942, in Skaneateles, New York, to Louise (née Basel; 1915–1993) and Robert Hunter (1914–1991) who were Presbyterians. She attended Penn Hall, a secondary boarding school in Pennsylvania. She was active in the school's French club, hockey, swimming and student council. After secondary school, she attended Syracuse University and was a school teacher in the Syracuse City School District. She was an English teacher at the Bellevue Academy in Syracuse, New York. She was related to former Auburn city councilman Robert Hunter.

Marriage and family life 
Neilia Hunter met Joe Biden in Nassau, Bahamas, while they were both on spring break. Shortly after, Biden moved to Syracuse and attended law school. The couple married on August 27, 1966. After Biden graduated from law school, the Bidens moved to Wilmington, Delaware, where Biden was on the New Castle County Council. The couple had three children: Joseph Robinette "Beau", Robert Hunter and Naomi Christina "Amy". While Biden campaigned to unseat U.S. Senator from Delaware J. Caleb Boggs, Neilia was described by The News Journal as the "brains" of his campaign.

Death 
On December 18, 1972, shortly after Joe became U.S. senator-elect, Neilia was driving with her three children west along rural Valley Road in Hockessin, Delaware. At the intersection with Delaware Route 7 (Limestone Road), she pulled out in front of a tractor-trailer truck traveling north along Route 7. Police determined that Neilia drove into the path of the tractor-trailer, possibly due to visibility issues. The truck driver, identified as Curtis C. Dunn, 33, of Avondale, Pa., escaped without any major injury. All four occupants were taken to Wilmington General Hospital, where Neilia and Naomi were pronounced dead on arrival, but Beau and Hunter both survived with multiple serious injuries. Two weeks after the crash, Joe was sworn in to the Senate at the hospital, where Beau and Hunter were being treated. Neilia and Naomi were buried in St. Joseph on the Brandywine Cemetery in Greenville, Delaware.

Legacy 
In a commencement speech at Yale University in 2015, Joe Biden, then serving as Vice President of the United States in the administration led by Barack Obama, spoke of his wife, saying, "The incredible bond I have with my children is the gift I'm not sure I would have had, had I not been through what I went through [after the fatal crash]. But by focusing on my sons, I found my redemption."

A park in a suburban area of unincorporated New Castle County, Delaware, outside the city of Wilmington, Neilia Hunter Biden Park, is dedicated in her memory. Cayuga Community College in Auburn, New York, where Neilia's father ran the food service operation for many years, annually confers the Neilia Hunter Biden Award on two graduates, one for journalism and one for English literature. Among the early winners was William "Bill" Fulton, who later served as mayor of Ventura, California.

A memorial plaque was erected at Bellevue Elementary School in Syracuse in Neilia's memory.

References

External links 
Neilia Hunter Biden at Find a Grave
Neilia Hunter

1942 births
1972 deaths
20th-century American educators
Neilia
Educators from Delaware
Schoolteachers from New York (state)
20th-century American women educators
People from Skaneateles, New York
People from Wilmington, Delaware
Road incident deaths in Delaware
Spouses of Delaware politicians
Syracuse City School District
Syracuse University College of Arts and Sciences alumni
Burials in New Castle County, Delaware